East Luwu Regency is the most easterly of the twenty-one regencies in South Sulawesi Province of Indonesia. It covers an area of 6,944.88 km2. The administrative capital of the regency is the coastal town of Malili on the Bay of Usu, itself an inlet in the northeast corner of the Gulf of Bone; the town, with its port of Balantang, is the shipping port for one of the world's major nickel-producing plants. The population of the Regency was 243,069 at the 2010 Census and 296,741 at the 2020 Census; the official estimate as at mid 2021 was 300,511.

Malili Lakes 
The eastern part of the regency contains the large natural fresh-water lakes of Lake Towuti (Danau Towuti) covering an area of 561 km2 in the south-east and Lake Matana (Danau Matana) covering 164 km2 further north, as well as the smaller Danau Mahalona between them. These (with the even smaller Danau Masapi and Danau Lontoa) form the Malili Lake system. Danau Towuti, which is 48 km wide, is the largest lake on Sulawesi, and contains the island of Pulau Luha within it. Danau Matana is the deepest lake in Indonesia (and the deepest lake on an island in the world), reaching a depth of 590 metres.

On the south shore of Lake Matana is the town of Soroako, the centre for the nickel processing plant, and its massive mine complex. Soroako, with its satellite villages of Wasuponda and Wawandula, are connected by a modern highway to the sea at Malili.

Administration 
East Luwu Regency is divided into eleven administrative Districts (Kecamatan), tabulated below with their areas and their populations at the 2010 Census  and the 2020 Census, toghether with the official estimates as at mid 2021. The table also includes the locations of the district administrative centres, the numbers of administrative villages (totalling 125 rural desa and 3 urban kelurahan) in each district.

Notes: (a) including the kelurahan of Tomoni. (b) including the kelurahan of Malili. (c) including the kelurahan of Magani.

Climate
Kanowit has a tropical rainforest climate (Af) with heavy rainfall year-round.

References

External links 

 

Regencies of South Sulawesi